The Chinese Academy of Sciences (CAS; ; known by Academia Sinica in English until the 1980s) is the national academy of the People's Republic of China for natural sciences. It has historical origins in the Academia Sinica during the Republican era and was formerly also known by that name. The academy functions as the national scientific think tank and academic governing body, providing advisory and appraisal services on issues stemming from the national economy, social development, and science and technology progress. It is headquartered in Xicheng District, Beijing, with branch institutes all over mainland China. It has also created hundreds of commercial enterprises, Lenovo being one of the most famous.

CAS is the world's largest research organization. It had 69,000 full time staffs plus 79,000 graduate students, and 130 institutes in 2022, and has been consistently ranked among the top research organizations around the world. The academy also runs the University of Science and Technology of China and the University of the Chinese Academy of Sciences.

CAS has been ranked the No. 1 research institute in the world by Nature Index since the list's inception in 2014 by Nature Portfolio. It was the most productive institution publishing articles on sustainable development indexed in Web of Science from 1981 to 2018 among all universities and research institutions in the world.

Membership

Membership of the Chinese Academy of Sciences, also known by the title Academician of the Chinese Academy of Sciences, is a lifelong honor given to Chinese scientists who have made significant achievements in various fields. According to the Bylaws for Members of the Chinese Academy of Sciences adopted in 1992 and recently amended in 2014, it is the highest academic title in China. A formal CAS member must hold Chinese citizenship, although foreigner citizens may be elected as CAS foreign academicians. Members older than 80 are designated as "senior members" and may no longer hold leading positions in the organization. Academicians of the Chinese Academy of Sciences carry an obligation to advance science and technology, to advocate and uphold scientific spirit, to develop a scientific and technological workforce, to attend member meetings and receive consultation and evaluation tasks, and to promote international exchanges and cooperation. Academicians can give suggestions and influence Chinese state policy related to science and technology.

Organization

Scientific integrity
On 26 February 2007, CAS published a Declaration of Scientific Ideology and set up a commission for scientific integrity to promote transparency, autonomy and accountability of scientific research in the country. Around that same time, the Ministry of Science and Technology also initiated measures to address misconduct in state-funded programs.

Publications 

Together with the National Natural Science Foundation of China, the academy publishes the peer-reviewed academic journal, Science China (also known as Science in China). Science China comprises seven series:
 A: Mathematics
 B: Chemistry
 C: Life Sciences
 D: Earth Sciences
 E: Technological Sciences
 F: Information Sciences
 G: Physics, Mechanics and Astronomy

CAS also promotes the China Open Access Journals (COAJ) platform, a national variant of the international Directory of Open Access Journals (DOAJ).

Awards
Since 1999 the CAS has issued the annual State Preeminent Science and Technology Award, presented by the President of China to the recipient.

International cooperation 
The Institute of Remote Sensing and Digital Earth is a branch of CAS. The Institute of Remote Sensing and Digital Earth was a customer of Swedish Space Corporation (SSC), which provides data transmission services from satellites for a wide range of societal functions. It was reported by Reuters on 21 September 2020 that SSC decided not to renew the contracts with China to help operate Chinese satellites from SSC's ground stations, or seek new business with China.

In 2023, the Pasteur Institute suspended ties with CAS.

See also

 Academia Sinica
 China Science Publishing & Media
 Chinese Academy of Engineering
 Chinese Academy of Social Sciences
 Chinese Science Citation Database
 Hanlin Academy
 History of science and technology in the People's Republic of China
 International Journal of Software and Informatics (IJSI)
 International Society of Zoological Sciences
 Legend Holdings
 Science and technology in China
 Scientific publishing in China
 Shanghai Academy of Social Sciences
 ShanghaiTech University
 University of Chinese Academy of Sciences
 University of Science and Technology of China
 University of Chinese Academy of Social Sciences

References

Citations

Sources

External links 
 

 
1949 establishments in China
China
Schools in Xicheng District
Scientific organizations established in 1949
Universities and colleges in Beijing